The Image is a 1990 American made-for-television drama film directed by Peter Werner and written by Brian Rehak. The film stars Albert Finney, John Mahoney, Kathy Baker, Swoosie Kurtz, Marsha Mason and Spalding Gray. The film premiered on HBO on January 27, 1990. It was nominated for two Primetime Emmy Awards, Outstanding Lead Actor in a Miniseries or a Special for Finney and Outstanding Supporting Actress in a Miniseries or a Special for Kurtz.

Plot
Jason Cromwell (Finney) is a leading TV newsman whose investigation of a bank scandal drives a wrongly accused executive to suicide and forces him to make important decisions about his life and career.

Cast
Albert Finney as Jason Cromwell
John Mahoney as Irv Mickelson
Kathy Baker as Marcie Guilford
Swoosie Kurtz as Joanne Winstow-Darvish
Marsha Mason as Jean Cromwell
Spalding Gray as Frank Goodrich
Wendie Jo Sperber as Anita Cox
David Clennon as Dr. Sigmond Grampton
Brett Cullen as Malcolm Dundee
Jim Haynie as David Hartzfield
Robert Schenkkan as Wilton Hale
Nicholas Cascone as Sid Stillwell
Beth Grant as Martha Packard
Banks Harper as Jean Hartzfield
Brad Pitt as Steve Black
Robert Aaron as Tom Packard
Adilah Barnes as Nedra Scroggins

References

External links
 

1990 films
1990 television films
American drama television films
1990 drama films
HBO Films films
Films directed by Peter Werner
Films scored by James Newton Howard
1990s English-language films
1990s American films